The men's road race at the 1994 UCI Road World Championships was the 61st edition of the event. The race took place on Sunday 28 August 1994 in Agrigento, Italy. The race was won by Luc Leblanc of France.

Final classification

References

Men's Road Race
UCI Road World Championships – Men's road race